The 1968 Auburn Tigers football team represented Auburn University in the 1968 NCAA University Division football season. It was the Tigers' 77th overall and 35th season as a member of the Southeastern Conference (SEC). The team was led by head coach Ralph "Shug" Jordan, in his 18th year, and played their home games at Cliff Hare Stadium in Auburn and Legion Field in Birmingham, Alabama. They finished with a record of seven wins and four losses (7–4 overall, 4–2 in the SEC) and with a victory over Arizona in the Sun Bowl.

Schedule

Source: 1968 Auburn football schedule

Personnel

References

Auburn
Auburn Tigers football seasons
Sun Bowl champion seasons
Auburn Tigers football